The astrolabe of Barcelona is considered the most ancient astrolabe with Carolingian characters that has survived in the Christian Occident.
The French researcher Marcel Destombes founded the astrolabe, and left it as legacy to the Institute of the Arab World of Paris in 1983.

The Academy of Sciences of Barcelona asked the astrolabe in loan to the Musée of l'Institut du Monde Arabe, to make a replica, today this replica is on display at the Academy of Sciences in the Ramblas.

Description 
This astrolabe presents some unusual characteristics. All the engraved characters are in Latin, this fact made the scholars think that the instrument was made in the Christian Europe. The pointers of his "spider" indicate eighteen stars: ten boreal stars  and eight austral stars (that is to say, situated beneath of the equator). Eleven of them correspond to the date of 980 AD. Still like this, the names of the stars are not engraved on the brass. The words ROME and FRANCE are engraved in Latin characters in one of the eardrums. These characters are accompanied by the numbers 41-30 (in Arabic figures). The characters are identical to those used at the end of the 10th century in the Catalan Latin manuscripts, being Catalonia in that moment a mark of the Carolingian France. This would explain the presence of the word FRANCE. The figures express in degrees and minutes: 41° 30′, which correspond exactly to the latitude of Barcelona.

The fact of having engraved the date 980 AD. and the latitude of Barcelona (41–30), which  archdeacon in those dates was Sunifred Llobet, to whom is attributed the authorship of the Ripoll's manuscript: ms.225,  which contains the description of an astrolabe, has led the scholars to attribute the paternity of the astrolabe to this famous astronomer, also known with the name of Lupitus Barchinonensis

Data 
 Name: Astrolabe of Barcelona
 Place of manufacture: Barcelona, Principality of Catalonia
 Date / period: To the year 980
 Material and technical: Brass decorated with recorded
 Dimensions: 15,2 cm of diameter
 Conservation (city): Paris
 Conservation (place): Bequeathed by Marcel Destombes to the Musée of l'Institut du Monde Arabe (Paris)
 Number of inventory: AY 86-31

See also 
 Gerbert of Aurillac
 Lupito of Barcelona

References

External links 
 ‘Carolingian' astrolabe. To Qantara – Mediterranean Heritage (English)

Astronomy
History of Barcelona